Claire Mackay (December 21, 1930 - August 11, 2013) was a Canadian writer of eleven books for children and young-adult fiction and non-fiction.

Early life and education
Mackay was born Claire Lorraine Bacchus.  She was raised in Toronto, Ontario. Mackay received a scholarship to the University of Toronto, where she earned an honors BA in Political Science.

Career
Mackay began her writing career by writing newsletter, newspaper and magazine articles.  She was motivated to write her first children's book when she found that there was a lack of books about mini-bikes for her son to read.  She wrote Mini-Bike Hero in 1979, which was published by Scholastic Canada. The book sold more than 450,00 copies. Mackay wrote two more related books, Mini-Bike Race  and Mini-Bike Rescue.

Mackay was one of the eleven co-founders of the Canadian Society of Children's Authors, Illustrators and Performers (CANSCAIP).

Mackay's work has been published by Annick Press, Kids Can Press, James Lorimer, Scholastic Canada, and Tundra Books.

Personal
While at the University of Toronto, Claire met Jackson Mackay, an engineering student and later a chemical engineer for Imperial Oil.  They married in 1952 and had three sons.  The family moved several times to accommodate Jack's work, living in Vancouver, Regina, and Sarnia, before finally settling in Toronto, Ontario.

Claire Mackay died on August 11, 2013 at the age of 82 from cancer.

Awards
In 1982 Mackay and co-author Marsha Hewitt received the Ruth Schwartz Award for their Young Adult novel One Proud Summer (Women's Press).  In 1983 she received the Vicki Metcalf Award, presented for an outstanding body of work in children's literature, and in 1988 for Marvin and Me and the Flies.

Bibliography
 Mini-Bike Hero  1974
 Mini-Bike Racer   1976
 Exit Barney McGee   1979
 Mini-Bike Rescue 1982
 The Minerva Program  1984
 Marvin and Me and the Flies in Canadian children's annual, 12 1987
 Pay Cheques and Picket Lines: All About Unions in Canada  1987  
 The Toronto Story  1990
 Touching all the Bases: Baseball for Kids of All Ages  1994
 First Folks and Vile Voyageurs 2001

Co-authored books

 One Proud Summer   Hewitt, Marsha, and Mackay, Claire  1981
 Bats About Baseball  Little, Jean, and Mackay, Claire   1985

References

External links
 Profile by CANSCAIP
 Profile by The Canadian Children's Book Centre

1930 births
2013 deaths
Canadian children's writers
University of Toronto alumni
Writers from Toronto